Islands in the Stream is a 1977 American drama film, an adaptation of Ernest Hemingway's posthumously published 1970 novel of the same name. The film was directed by Franklin J. Schaffner and starred George C. Scott, Hart Bochner, Claire Bloom, Gilbert Roland, and David Hemmings. The film was nominated for an Academy Award for Best Cinematography, losing to Close Encounters of the Third Kind.

Plot
Artist Thomas Hudson is an American who has left the civilized world for a simple life in the Caribbean. Schaffner tells the tale in four parts:

The Island - Introduces Hudson and the people he knows. It is set in The Bahamas, circa 1940. Tom is concerned about his friend Eddy, who loves to drink and brawl with anyone he finds. Later the residents of the island and Tom celebrate the Queen Mother's anniversary.
The Boys - Weeks after the celebrations for the Queen Mother, Tom is reunited with his three sons. It is a bittersweet reunion, because he left them and his wife Audrey four years before. Later they go on a challenging fishing trek to catch a Marlin. The segment ends as the boys return to the United States, where oldest son Tom joins the Royal Air Force in time for the Battle of Britain. Their father writes and tells them in a monologue how much he misses them.
The Woman - Tom's wife Audrey is introduced. She turns up unexpectedly and Tom wonders if she wants to get back together. Tom has already told his oldest son that he has never loved anyone else. However, she reveals that she is getting married again, although she clearly still has feelings for Tom. Tom is puzzled about why she has returned and angry, then realises why - she is there to tell him that young Tom is dead. They comfort each other, then she leaves, as planned.
The Journey - Tom attempts to help refugees escape the Nazis. He is accompanied by Joseph and Eddy. Leaving the British-owned Bahamas for the waters near neutral Cuba, Tom finds the refugees and tries to conduct them to the port of Havana, and ultimately to the U.S. He worries that he may not be able to trust Eddy, that the refugees may not survive the voyage, and this trip may be suicide for all concerned if they face the Cuban Coast Guard.  Just short of their goal, a Cuban gunboat appears, but Tom saves his passengers by staging a diversion for the Cuban sailors, and the refugees reach dry land.  Tom hopes to save his own ship by spilling fuel onto the water, which he then ignites.  While Tom's crew survives, he is cut down by gunfire from the Cuban boat.  As he hovers between life and death, Tom has a vision of his beloved house by the sea, now empty.  There he is joined by Audrey and his sons.  They embrace and then leave the house.  Knowing that his life is about to end, Tom muses that he was very lucky to have the life he had.

Cast
 George C. Scott as Thomas Hudson
 David Hemmings as Eddy
 Gilbert Roland as Captain Ralph
 Susan Tyrrell as Lil
 Richard Evans as Willy
 Claire Bloom as Audrey Hudson
 Julius Harris as Joseph
 Hart Bochner as Tom Hudson
 Brad Savage as Andrew Hudson
 Michael-James Wixted as David Hudson
 Hildy Brooks as Helga Ziegner

References

External links
 
 
 
 

1977 films
1970s adventure drama films
American adventure drama films
Films about fictional painters
Films based on American novels
Films based on works by Ernest Hemingway
Films scored by Jerry Goldsmith
Films directed by Franklin J. Schaffner
Films set in 1940
Films set in the Bahamas
Films set in the Caribbean
Paramount Pictures films
Seafaring films
American World War II films
1977 drama films
1970s English-language films
1970s American films